Adrien Leroy (born 2 January 1981) is a French poet and chess player. He received the FIDE title of FIDE Master (FM) in 1991.

Biography
In 1991, in Mamaia, Adrien Leroy won inaugural European Youth Chess Championship in the U10 age group. In this same year in Warsaw, he also won World Youth Chess Championship in the U10 age group. Adrien Leroy has been awarded the FIDE Master title for this success. He was also the winner of the French Chess Championships in this age group.

In 1996, Adrien Leroy left the chess career and seriously turned to poetry. He has published several poetry books. In his poetry, Adrien Leroy try to reflect the feelings of the adolescent world and writing about the young person's contact with the world around him.

Works 
 Adrien Leroy. Cendre de nuit (éd. Librairie-Galerie Racine, 2000).
 Adrien Leroy. Trame de flèches noires (éd. Librairie-Galerie Racine, 2003).
 Adrien Leroy. Là où je prends feu (Jacques André éditeur, 2011).
 Adrien Leroy. Cicatrices dans les souvenirs de l'aube (Harmattan, 2018).

References

External links
 
 
 
 

1981 births
Living people
Sportspeople from Paris
French chess players
Chess FIDE Masters
French poets